The following is a list of centenarians – specifically, people who became famous as politicians and government servants – known for reasons other than their longevity. For more lists, see lists of centenarians. For a list of supercentenarians (people who have attained the age of at least 110 years, notable for reasons other than just longevity), see List of supercentenarians.

References

Politicians and government servants